Bulls vs Lakers and the NBA Playoffs is a basketball video game produced by Don Traeger and developed by Electronic Arts and released in 1992 for the Sega Mega Drive and the SNES. The game is the sequel to Lakers versus Celtics. The game's name refers to the previous season's NBA championship series, the 1991 NBA Finals matchup between the Chicago Bulls and Los Angeles Lakers. It is the second game in the NBA Playoffs series of games.

Bulls vs Lakers introduced a television broadcast-style presentation with a fictional television network, "EASN", the Electronic Arts Sports Network. Bing Gordon, the Chief Creative Officer of Electronic Arts, was featured as the game announcer. This was also the first game to depict NBA team logos on the courts.

Gameplay
The game can be played in various ways: players could play against each other, or against the computer. Games against the computer were divided into two modes, "Exhibition" or "Playoffs". Players could pick from one of the 16 teams that competed in the 1991 NBA Playoffs (up from 8 in the first game). Rosters featured many top NBA stars of the time, including Michael Jordan. Games could be configured for 2, 5, 8 or 12 minute quarters. New to the series is a star underneath the player to let users easily know which player they are controlling.

Reception

MegaTech said that the game had impressive graphics and atmosphere, but that it did not play as fast as David Robinson's Supreme Court.

External links

 
 Bulls vs Lakers and the NBA Playoffs at GameFAQs

1991 video games
Chicago Bulls
Electronic Arts games
Los Angeles Lakers
National Basketball Association video games
Sega Genesis games
Sega Genesis-only games
Multiplayer and single-player video games
Video games developed in the United States